Tom Clancy's Op-Center is a novel series, created by Tom Clancy and Steve Pieczenik, though the first 12 books were written by Jeff Rovin between 1995 and 2005. The four books in the series reboot from 2014 are written by Dick Couch, George Galdorisi and Jeff Rovin.

Main characters

These characters are in most or all stories from the main series:

Paul Hood: The Director of Op-Center and former Mayor of L.A.
General Mike Rodgers: Deputy Director of Op-Center and STRIKER Commander
Bob Herbert: Chief of Intelligence
Matt Stoll: In-house computer genius
Darrel McCaskey: The FBI Liaison
Lowell Coffey II: Op-Center's lawyer
Liz Gordon: Op-Center's psychologist

These characters are in the stories from the reboot series:
Chase Williams: The Director of Op-Center and a former U.S. Naval Admiral
Aaron Bleich: Geek Programmer and Data Analyst
Roger McCord: Intelligence Director
Brian Dawson: Operations Director
Jim Wright: Domestic Crisis Manager
Richard Middleton: Planning Director
Hector Rodriquez: JSOC Liaison, Retired Army Sergeant Major
Sandee Barron: Helicopter Pilot
Mike Volner: JSOC Response Team Commander
Allen Kim: FBI CIRG Team Leader

List of Op-Center Novels
The books in the Tom Clancy's Op-Center series:

National Crisis Management Center (Op-Center)
Although familiarly called "Op-Center", the actual name of the largely autonomous agency is the "National Crisis Management Center". The charter of the NCMC, or Op-Center, is unlike any other in the history of the United States. They handle both domestic and international crises. Director Paul Hood reports to the President himself, and what had started as "an information clearinghouse with SWAT capabilities" now has the singular capacity to monitor, initiate, and manage operations worldwide. The organization had its own paramilitary response team, called the Striker team, named by an Op-Center member who was a soccer fan, composed of members of the U.S. military special operations community. The series also mentioned similar organizations from England, whose response team was called Bengal, and Russia, with a team called Hammer. It is headquartered in a nondescript, two-story building located near the Naval Reserve flight line at Andrews Air Force Base that used to be a ready room, a staging area for crack flight crews. In the event of a nuclear attack, it would have been their job to evacuate key officials from Washington, D.C.

According to the 2014 reboot franchise, the NCMC was eventually disbanded after the Secretary of Defense and the Director of National Intelligence managed to convince the President of the United States to shut the organization down due to the effectiveness of the US Intelligence Community and Special Forces in the War on Terror (much to the disgust of Paul Hood and Mike Rogers). Years later however, terrorists blow up several NFL stadiums across the country and leave thousands dead or mutilated. It is determined in the resulting investigation that the inability of government agencies to prevent the attacks was due to a lack of information, as well as the inability to put the pieces together in time. In response, the President executes an emergency order that reboots Op-Center for the 21st Century. Retired Admiral Chase Williams is eventually named the new director and Op-Center's new headquarters is located in the basement of the National Geospatial Intelligence Agency; as its response team, Op-Center utilizes soldiers from the Joint Special Operations Command for overseas missions and a SWAT team from the FBI's Critical Incident Response Group in order to respond to domestic emergencies.

Net Force
The third Op-Center novel, Games of State, briefly alludes to the concept of a "Net Force". This concept was later expanded into its own Net Force series, created by the same men as Op-Center but written by Steve Perry (and later cowritten with Larry Segriff). No direct connection has yet been drawn between the two series, however.

In other media

OP Center was a 1995 made-for-TV movie starring Harry Hamlin as Paul Hood, newly minted director of the "OP Center".

In The Simpsons episode "Sweets and Sour Marge", it reveals that Moe Szyslak's favourite book is Tom Clancy's Op-Center.

References

External links
 Penguin (publisher)

See also

 
Book series introduced in 1995
Novel series
Novels about terrorism
Techno-thriller novels